Julius Dixon is an American football coach and former player. He is the former head football coach at Point University in West Point, Georgia, a position he has held since 2016. Dixon served as the interim head football coach at Savannah State University in 2010.

Head coaching record

References

Year of birth missing (living people)
Living people
American football defensive backs
Furman Paladins football coaches
Furman Paladins football players
Point Skyhawks football coaches
Presbyterian Blue Hose football coaches
Reinhardt Eagles football coaches
Savannah State Tigers football coaches
Shorter Hawks football coaches
African-American coaches of American football
African-American players of American football
21st-century African-American people